A joint venture (JV) is a business entity created by two or more parties, generally characterized by shared ownership, shared returns and risks, and shared governance. Companies typically pursue joint ventures for one of four reasons: to access a new market, particularly Emerging market; to gain scale efficiencies by combining assets and operations; to share risk for major investments or projects; or to access skills and capabilities.

According to Gerard Baynham of Water Street Partners, there has been much negative press about joint ventures, but objective data indicate that they may actually outperform wholly owned and controlled affiliates. He writes, "A different narrative emerged from our recent analysis of U.S. Department of Commerce (DOC) data, collected from more than 20,000 entities. According to the DOC data, foreign joint ventures of U.S. companies realized a 5.5 percent average return on assets (ROA), while those companies’ wholly owned and controlled affiliates (the vast majority of which are wholly owned) realized a slightly lower 5.2 percent ROA. The same story holds true for investments by foreign companies in the U.S., but the difference is more pronounced. U.S.-based joint ventures realized a 2.2 percent average ROA, while wholly owned and controlled affiliates in the U.S. only realized a 0.7 percent ROA."

Most joint ventures are incorporated, although some, as in the Oil and gas industry, are "unincorporated" joint ventures that mimic a corporate entity. With individuals, when two or more persons come together to form a temporary partnership for the purpose of carrying out a particular project, such partnership can also be called a joint venture where the parties are "co-venturers".

The venture can be a business JV (for example, Dow Corning), a project/asset JV intended to pursue one specific project only, or a JV aimed at defining standards or serving as an "industry utility" that provides a narrow set of services to industry participants.

Some major joint ventures include United Launch Alliance, Vevo, Hulu, Penske Truck Leasing, and Owens-Corning.

Legal definition 
In European law, the term "joint venture" is an exclusive legal concept, better defined under the rules of company law. In France, the term "joint venture" is variously translated as  "association d'entreprises", "entreprise conjointe", "coentreprise" or "entreprise commune".

Company incorporation
A JV can be brought about in the following major ways:

 Foreign investor buying an interest in a local company
 Local firm acquiring an interest in an existing foreign firm
 Both the foreign and local entrepreneurs jointly forming a new enterprise
 Together with public capital and/or bank debt

In the UK, India, and in many common law countries, a joint-venture (or else a company formed by a group of individuals) must file with the appropriate authority the memorandum of association. It is a statutory document which informs the outside public of its existence. It may be viewed by the public at the office in which it is filed. A sample can be seen at wikimedia.org. Together with the articles of association, it forms the "constitution" of a company in these countries.

The articles of association regulate the interaction between shareholders and the directors of a company and can be a lengthy document of up to 700,000+
pages. It deals with the powers relegated by the stockholders to the directors and those withheld by them, requiring the passing of ordinary resolutions, special resolutions and the holding of Extraordinary General Meetings to bring the directors' decision to bear.

A Certificate of Incorporation or the Articles of Incorporation is a document required to form a corporation in the U.S. (in actuality, the state where it is incorporated) and in countries following the practice. In the US, the "constitution" is a single document. The Articles of Incorporation is again a regulation of the directors by the stock-holders in a company.

By its formation, the JV becomes a new entity with the implication:

 that it is officially separate from its Founders, who might otherwise be giant corporations, even amongst the emerging countries
 the JV can contract in its own name, acquire rights (such as the right to buy new companies), and
 it has a separate liability from that of its founders, except for invested capital
 it can sue (and be sued) in courts in defense or its pursuance of its objectives.

On the receipt of the Certificate of Incorporation, a company can commence its business.

Shareholders' agreement
This is a legal area and is fraught with difficulty as the laws of countries differ, particularly on the enforceability of "heads of" or shareholder agreements. For some legal reasons, it may be called a Memorandum of Understanding. It is done in parallel with other activities in forming a JV. Though dealt with briefly for a shareholders' agreement, some issues must be dealt with here as a preamble to the discussion that follows.  There are also many issues which are not in the Articles when a company starts up or never ever present. Also, a JV may elect to stay as a JV alone in a "quasi partnership" to avoid any nonessential disclosure to the government or the public.

Some of the issues in a shareholders' agreement are:

 Valuation of intellectual rights, say, the valuations of the IPR of one partner and, say, the real estate of the other
 The control of the company either by the number of directors or its "funding"
 The number of directors and the rights of the founders to their appoint directors which shows as to whether a shareholder dominates or shares equality.
 Management decisions – whether the board manages or a founder
 Transferability of shares – assignment rights of the founders to other members of the company
 Dividend policy – percentage of profits to be declared when there is profit
 Winding up – the conditions, notice to members
 Confidentiality of know-how and founders' agreement and penalties for disclosure
 First right of refusal – purchase rights and counter-bid by a founder.

There are many features which have to be incorporated into the shareholders' agreement which is quite private to the parties as they start off. Normally, it requires no submission to any authority.

The other basic document which must be articulated is the Articles, which is a published document and known to members. This repeats the shareholders agreement as to the number of directors each founder can appoint to the board of directors; whether the board controls or the founders; the taking of decisions by simple majority (50%+1) of those present or a 51% or 75% majority with all directors present (their alternates/proxy); the deployment of funds of the firm; extent of debt; the proportion of profit that can be declared as dividends; etc. Also significant is what will happen if the firm is dissolved, if one of the partners dies, or if the firm is sold.

Often, the most successful JVs are those with 50:50 partnership with each party having the same number of directors but rotating control over the firm, or rights to appoint the Chairperson and Vice-chair of the company. Sometimes a party may give a separate trusted person to vote in its place proxy vote of the Founder at board meetings.

Recently, in a major case the Indian Supreme Court has held that Memorandums of Understanding (whose details are not in the articles of association) are "unconstitutional" giving more transparency to undertakings.

Dissolution 
The JV is not a permanent structure. It can be dissolved when:

 Aims of original venture met
 Aims of original venture not met
 Either or both parties develop new goals
 Either or both parties no longer agree with joint venture aims
 Time agreed for joint venture has expired
 Legal or financial issues
 Evolving market conditions mean that joint venture is no longer appropriate or relevant
 One party acquires the other

Risks 
Joint ventures are risky forms of business partnerships. Literature in business and management has paid attention to different factors of conflict and opportunism in joint ventures, in particular the influence of parent control structure, ownership change, and volatile environment.

Joint ventures in different jurisdictions

China 
According to a report of the United Nations Conference on Trade and Development 2003, China was the recipient of US$53.5 billion in direct foreign investment, making it the world's largest recipient of direct foreign investment for the first time, to exceed the USA. Also, it approved the establishment of nearly 500,000 foreign-investment enterprises. The US had 45,000 projects (by 2004) with an in-place investment of over 48 billion.

Until recently, no guidelines existed on how foreign investment was to be handled due to the restrictive nature of China toward foreign investors. Following the death of Mao Zedong in 1976, initiatives in foreign trade began to be applied, and law applicable to foreign direct investment was made clear in 1979, while the first Sino-foreign equity venture took place in 2001. The corpus of the law has improved since then.

Companies with foreign partners can carry out manufacturing and sales operations in China and can sell through their own sales network. Foreign-Sino companies have export rights which are not available to wholly Chinese companies, as China desires to import foreign technology by encouraging JVs and the latest technologies.

Under Chinese law, foreign enterprises are divided into several basic categories. Of these, five will be described or mentioned here: three relate to industry and services and two as vehicles for foreign investment.
Those five categories of Chinese foreign enterprises are: the Sino-Foreign Equity Joint Ventures (EJVs), Sino-Foreign Co-operative Joint Ventures (CJVs), Wholly Foreign-Owned Enterprises (WFOE), although they do not strictly belong to Joint Ventures, plus foreign investment companies limited by shares (FICLBS), and Investment Companies through Foreign Investors (ICFI). Each category is described below.

Equity joint ventures 
The EJV Law is between a Chinese partner and a foreign company. It is incorporated in both Chinese (official) and in English (with equal validity), with limited liability.  Prior to China's entry into WTO – and thus the WFOEs – EJVs predominated. In the EJV mode, the partners share profits, losses, and risk in equal proportion to their respective contributions to the venture's registered capital. These escalate upwardly in the same proportion as the increase in registered capital.

The JV contract accompanied by the articles of association for the EJV are the two most fundamental legal documents of the project. The Articles mirror many of the provisions of the JV contract. In case of conflict the JV document has precedence. These documents are prepared at the same time as the feasibility report. There are also the ancillary documents (termed "offsets" in the US) covering know-how and trademarks and supply-of-equipment agreements.

The minimum equity is prescribed for investment (truncated),
where the foreign equity and debt levels are:
  Less than US$3 million, equity must constitute 70% of the investment;
  Between US$3 million and US$10 million, minimum equity must be US$2.1 million and at least 50% of the investment;
  Between US$10 million and US$30 million, minimum equity must be US$5 million and at least 40% of the investment;
  More than US$30 million, minimum equity must be US$12 million and at least 1/3 of the investment.

There are also intermediary levels.

The foreign investment in the total project must be at least 25%. No minimum investment is set for the Chinese partner. The timing of investments must be mentioned in the Agreement and failure to invest in the indicated time, draws a penalty.

Cooperative joint ventures  

Co-operative Joint Ventures (CJVs) are permitted under the Sino-Foreign Co-operative Joint Ventures.  Co-operative enterprises are also called Contractual Operative Enterprises.

The CJVs may have a limited structure or unlimited – therefore, there are two versions. The limited-liability version is similar to the EJVs in status of permissions – the foreign investor provides the majority of funds and technology and the Chinese party provides land, buildings, equipment, etc. However, there are no minimum limits on the foreign partner which allows him to be a minority shareholder.

The other format of the CJV is similar to a partnership where the parties jointly incur unlimited liability for the debts of the enterprise with no separate legal person being created. In both the cases, the status of the formed enterprise is that of a legal Chinese person which can hire labor directly as, for example, a Chinese national contactor. The minimum of the capital is registered at various levels of investment.

Other differences from the EJV are to be noted:

A Co-operative JV does not have to be a legal entity.
The partners in a CJV are allowed to share profit on an agreed basis, not necessarily in proportion to capital contribution. This proportion also determines the control and the risks of the enterprise in the same proportion.
It may be possible to operate in a CJV in a restricted area
A CJV could allow negotiated levels of management and financial control, as well as methods of recourse associated with equipment leases and service contracts. In an EJV management control is through allocation of Board seats.
During the term of the venture, the foreign participant can recover his investment, provided the contract prescribes that and all fixed assets will become the property of the Chinese participant on termination of the JV.
Foreign partners can often obtain the desired level of control by negotiating management, voting, and staffing rights into a CJV's articles; since control does not have to be allocated according to equity stakes.

Convenience and flexibility are the characteristics of this type of investment. It is therefore easier to find co-operative partners and to reach an agreement.

With changes in the law, it becomes possible to merge with a Chinese company for a quick start. A foreign investor does not need to set up a new corporation in China. Instead, the investor uses the Chinese partner's business license, under a contractual arrangement. However, under the CJV, the land stays in the possession of the Chinese partner.

There is another advantage: the percentage of the CJV owned by each partner can change throughout the JV's life, giving the option to the foreign investor, by holding higher equity, obtains a faster rate of return with the concurrent wish of the Chinese partner of a later larger role of maintaining long-term control.

The parties in any of the ventures, EJV, CJV or WFOE prepare a feasibility study outlined above. It is a non-binding document – the parties are still free to choose not to proceed with the project. The feasibility study must cover the fundamental technical and commercial aspects of the project, before the parties can proceed to formalize the necessary legal documentation. The study should contain details referred to earlier under Feasibility Study (submissions by the Chinese partner).

Wholly foreign-owned enterprises (WFOEs) 

There is basic law of the PRC concerning enterprises with sole foreign investment controls, WFOEs. China's entry into the World Trade Organization (WTO) around 2001 has had profound effects on foreign investment. Not being a JV, they are considered here only in comparison or contrast.

To implement WTO commitments, China publishes from time to time updated versions of its "Catalogs Investments" (affecting ventures) prohibited, restricted.

The WFOE is a Chinese legal person and has to obey all Chinese laws. As such, it is allowed to enter into contracts with appropriate government authorities to acquire land use rights, rent buildings, and receive utility services. In this it is more similar to a CJV than an EJV.

WFOEs are expected by PRC to use the most modern technologies and to export at least 50% of their production, with all of the investment is to be wholly provided by the foreign investor and the enterprise is within his total control.

WFOEs are typically limited liability enterprises (like with EJVs) but the liability of the directors, managers, advisers, and suppliers depends on the rules which govern the Departments or Ministries which control product liability, worker safety or environmental protection.

An advantage the WFOE enjoys over its alternates is enhanced protection of its know-how but a principal disadvantage is absence of an interested and influential Chinese party.

As of the 3rd Quarter of 2004, WFOEs had replaced EJVs and CJVs as follows:

(*)=Financial Vventures by EJVs/CJVs
(**)=Approved JVs

Foreign investment companies limited by shares (FICLBS) 
These enterprises are formed under the Sino-Foreign Investment Act. The capital is composed of value of stock in exchange for the value of the property given to the enterprise. The liability of the shareholders, including debt, is equal to the number of shares purchased by each partner.

The registered capital of the company the share of the paid-in capital. The minimum amount of the registered capital of the company should be RMB 30 million. These companies can be listed on the only two PRC Stock Exchanges – the Shanghai and Shenzhen Stock Exchanges.  Shares of two types are permitted on these Exchanges – Types "A" and Type "B"  shares.

Type A are only to be used by Chinese nationals and can be traded only in RMB. Type "B" shares are denominated in Renminbi but can be traded in foreign exchange and by Chinese nationals having foreign exchange. Further, State enterprises which have been approved for corporatization can trade in Hong Kong in "H" share and in NYSE exchanges.

"A" shares are issued to and traded by Chinese nationals. They are issued and traded in Renminbi. "B" shares are denominated in Renminbi but are traded in foreign currency. From March 2001, in addition to foreign investors, Chinese nationals with foreign currency can also trade "B" shares.

Investment companies by foreign investors (ICFI) 
Investment companies are those established in China by sole foreign-funded business or jointly with Chinese partners who engage in direct investment. It has to be incorporated as a company with limited liability.

The total amount of the investor's assets during the year preceding the application to do business in China has to be no less than US$400 million within the territory of China. The paid-in capital contribution has to exceed $10 million. Furthermore, more than 3 project proposals of the investor's intended investment projects must have been approved. The shares subscribed and held by foreign Investment Companies by Foreign Investors (ICFI) should be 25%. The investment firm can be established as an EJV.

On March 15, 2019, China's National People's Congress adopted a unified Foreign Investment Law, which comes into effect on January 1, 2020.

List of prominent joint ventures in China 
 AMD-Chinese
 Huawei-Symantec
 Shanghai Automotive Industry Corporation (上海汽车集团股份有限公司), also known as SAIC (上汽) and SAIC-GM (上汽通用), is a Chinese state-owned automotive manufacturing company headquartered in Shanghaioperating in joint venture with US owned General Motors. Products produced by SAIC joint venture companies are sold under marques including Baojun, Buick, Chevrolet, Iveco, Škoda, and Volkswagen
 General Motors with SAIC Motor, formerly known as Shanghai General Motors Company Ltd., makes numerous cars in China in four factories, especially Buick, but also some Chevrolet and Cadillac models. In November 2018, the company announced new Chevrolet models for the Chinese market, including an extended-wheelbase Malibu XL, a new Chevy SUV concept, and a new Monza.
 Volkswagen Group China - The numerous VW and Audi cars manufactured in China are made under two joint-venture partnerships: FAW-Volkswagen and SAIC Volkswagen.
 Beijing Benz Automotive Co., Ltd is a joint venture between BAIC Motor and Daimler AG. As of November 22, 2018, a full two million Mercedes-Benz vehicles had been built in China by this alliance.
 Dongfeng Motor Corporation (东风汽车公司, abbreviated to 东风) is a Chinese state-owned automobile manufacturer headquartered in Wuhan. The company was the second-largest Chinese vehicle maker in 2017, by production volume, manufacturing over 4.1 million vehicles that year. Its own brands are Dongfeng, Venucia, and Dongfen Fengshen. Joint ventures include Cummins, Dana, Honda, Nissan, Infiniti, PSA Peugeot Citroën, Renault, Kia, and Yulon.  FAW Group Corporation (第一汽车集团, abbreviated to 一汽) is a Chinese state-owned automotive manufacturing company headquartered in Changchun. In 2017, the company ranked third in terms of output making 3.3 million vehicles. FAW sells products under at least ten different brands including its own and Besturn/Bēnténg, Dario, Haima, Hongqi, Jiaxing, Jie Fang, Jilin, Oley, Jie Fang and Yuan Zheng, and Tianjin Xiali. FAW joint ventures sell Audi, General Motors, Mazda, Toyota and Volkswagen.
 GAC (Guangzhou Automobile Group), is a Chinese state-owned automobile manufacturer headquartered in Guangzhou. They were the sixth biggest manufacturer in 2017, manufacturing over 2 million vehicles in 2017. GAC sells passenger cars under the Trumpchi brand. In China, they are more known for their foreign joint-venture with Fiat, Honda, Isuzu, Mitsubishi, and Toyota.
 Chang'an Automobile Group (重庆长安汽车股份有限公司, abbreviated to 长安) is an automobile manufacturer headquartered in Chongqing, and is a state-owned enterprise. In 2017, the company ranked fourth in terms of output making 2.8 million vehicles in 2017. Changan designs, develops, manufactures and sells passenger cars sold under the Changan brand and commercial vehicles sold under the Chana brand. Foreign joint venture companies include Suzuki, Ford, Mazda and PSA Peugeot Citroën.
 Chery, a Chinese state-owned automobile manufacturer based in Anhui. They were the tenth biggest manufacturer in 2017. They have a foreign joint venture with Jaguar Land Rover for the production of Jaguar and Land Rover cars in China.
 Brilliance Auto, is a Chinese state-owned automobile manufacturer based in Shenyang. They were the ninth biggest manufacturer in 2017. They have a foreign joint venture with BMW and also sells passenger vehicles under their own brand Brilliance and are expected to make 520,000 cars in China during 2019.
 Honda Motor Co has a joint venture with Guangzhou Automobile Group (GAC Group) 
 Geely-Volvo, Geely, is the biggest privately owned automobile manufacturer and seventh biggest manufacturer overall in China. Their flagship brand Geely Auto became the top Chinese car brand in 2017. Currently one of the fastest growing automotive groups in the world, Geely is known for their ownership of Swedish luxury car brand, Volvo. In China, their passenger car brands include Geely Auto, Volvo Cars, and Lynk & Co. The entire Volvo Cars company has been owned by the Chinese company Geely since 2010 and manufactures most of the XC60 vehicles in China for export.

India 
JV companies are the preferred form of corporate investment but there are no separate laws for joint ventures. Companies which are incorporated in India are treated on par as domestic companies.

 The above two parties subscribe to the shares of the JV company in agreed proportion, in cash, and start a new business.
 Two parties, (individuals or companies), incorporate a company in India. Business of one party is transferred to the company and as consideration for such transfer, shares are issued by the company and subscribed by that party. The other party subscribes for the shares in cash.
  Promoter shareholder of an existing Indian company and a third party, who/which may be individual/company, one of them non-resident or both residents, collaborate to jointly carry on the business of that company and its shares are taken by the said third party through payment in cash.

Private companies (only about $2500 is the lower limit of capital, no upper limit) are allowed in India together with and public companies, limited or not, likewise with partnerships. sole proprietorship too are allowed. However, the latter are reserved for NRIs.

Through capital market operations, foreign companies can transact on the two exchanges without prior permission of RBI but they cannot own more than 10 percent equity in paid-up capital of Indian enterprises, while aggregate foreign institutional investment (FII) in an enterprise is capped at 24 percent.

The establishment of wholly owned subsidiaries (WOS) and project offices and branch offices, incorporated in India or not. Sometimes, it is understood, that branches are started to test the market and get its flavor. Equity transfer from residents to non-residents in mergers and acquisitions (M&A) is usually permitted under the automatic route. However, if the M&As are in sectors and activities requiring prior government permission (Appendix 1 of the Policy) then transfer can proceed only after permission.

Joint ventures with trading companies are allowed together with imports of secondhand plants and machinery.

It is expected that in a JV, the foreign partner supplies technical collaboration and the pricing includes the foreign exchange component, while the Indian partner makes available the factory or building site and locally made machinery and product parts.  Many JVs are formed as public limited companies (LLCs) because of the advantages of limited liability.

Ukraine 
In Ukraine, most of joint ventures are operated in the form of Limited liability company, as there is no legal entity form as Joint venture. Protection of the rights of foreign investors is guaranteed by Law of Ukraine "On Foreign Investment". In Ukraine, JV can be established without legal entity formation and act under so called Cooperation Agreement (Dogovir pro spilnu diyalnist; Ukr. Договір про спільну діяльність). Under Ukraine civil code, CA can be established by two or more parties; rights and obligations of the parties are regulated by the agreement. Cooperation agreement has been widely spread in Ukraine, mainly in the field of oil and gas production. Since the Independence of Ukraine, Corruption doesn't allow to execute the Ukraine Law, Investors need to protect their Rights and Property themselves.

See also

 Common purpose, also known as a "joint enterprise" (criminal law)
 Division (business)
 International joint venture
 Joint venture broker
 Partnership
 Subsidiary

References

External links
Cornell Law School's Joint Venture Info Page Contains legal information and relevant definitions regarding joint venture partnerships
Joint Ventures Staged a Quiet Comeback Article written by Gerard Baynham, published in Chief Executive, evaluating joint venture performance.

Business law
Strategic alliances
 
Types of business entity